Momar N'Dao (born 21 March 1949) is a Senegalese sprinter. He competed in the 100 metres at the 1976 Summer Olympics and the 1980 Summer Olympics.

References

1949 births
Living people
Athletes (track and field) at the 1972 Summer Olympics
Athletes (track and field) at the 1976 Summer Olympics
Athletes (track and field) at the 1980 Summer Olympics
Senegalese male sprinters
Olympic athletes of Senegal
Place of birth missing (living people)